Liam Isherwood (born 13 July 2002) is an English professional footballer who plays as a goalkeeper for  club Accrington Stanley.

Playing career
Isherwood has been with Accrington Stanley since u12s. on 10 September 2020, Isherwood signed his 1st professional contract on a 1-year deal. On 7 October 2021, Isherwood signed a new one-year contract. In September 2021, Isherwood joined Stalybridge Celtic on loan. On 19 March 2022, he made his first-team debut for the Accrington Stanley, coming on for Harvey Rodgers as a 68th-minute substitute following Toby Savin's sending off against Plymouth Argyle. On 26 March 2022, Isherwood made his first league for Accrington Stanley starting the game against Gillingham.
In February 2023, Isherwood joined Marine on loan for a month.

Statistics

References

2002 births
Living people
Footballers from Blackburn
English footballers
Association football midfielders
Accrington Stanley F.C. players
English Football League players